A constitutional referendum was held in the Northern Mariana Islands on 6 November 1995. Voters were asked whether they approved of two proposed amendments to the constitution; one limiting the rights to vote on constitutional amendments that affected land ownership to native islanders, and one on establishing an Office of Finance to regulate the spending of the Legislature. The first proposal was approved by voters and the second rejected.

Background
Both proposals had been approved by a three-quarter majority in both houses of the Legislature, and required only a simple majority of votes in the referendum to be approved.

Results

Voting rights in constitutional referendums

Establishing an Office of Finance

The proposal was rejected by voters.

References

Referendums in the Northern Mariana Islands
Constitutional referendums in the Northern Mariana Islands
Constitutional
Northern Mariana 
Election and referendum articles with incomplete results